Paralives is an upcoming life simulation game for Windows and macOS developed by Paralives Studio with a team of 10 people. Inspired by The Sims, Paralives incorporates house building and management in a small open world town.

Gameplay
Paralives takes place in an open world with employment opportunities and different events, such as festivals. Players can build houses, create characters and control their lives in a desired way.

The character creator, titled as "Paramaker", allows the customization of the appearance with sliders and color wheel as the options. Players are able to make changes to the physique and height, and by using the color wheel, the root and the shade of the hair can be toggled as intended. A similar system is in place for objects and construction, allowing the player to adjust the size, placement and color of walls, floors, windows, doors, and furniture.

Development
Paralives was created by independent game developer Alex Massé. After working on several projects such as PewDiePie's Tuber Simulator and a number of demos for Project Tiny, Massé made a decision to quit his job and develop Paralives regularly. Development of the game started in January 2019 and the development was officially announced in June 2019. 

Initially, Paralives was a solo project, but Massé hired people to work on the game: Léa Sorribès, Christine Gariépy, and Anna Thibert, forming Paralives Studio. As of May 2021, the team consists of ten people in total after hiring a music composer.
Massé thought that previous life simulation games did not have a tool that allowed easy and precise creation of any house in-game, which prompted him to design Paralives to offer a sense of endless customization. He was inspired by the road tool found in Cities: Skylines, and tried to make it work in Paralives, thinking it would fit well for placing walls and building houses. The developers incorporated the technique of procedural animation, which involves automatic reactions based on previously created animations, to avoid the need of animating every situation possible and save some developing time. 

Considering the game is being funded through crowdfunding platform Patreon, the backers are invited to propose suggestions regarding what type of content would they like to see in the full release. Massé was influenced by Oobletss success on the service, and decided to join it as well, having admired the support it had just from the concept art and idea alone. He hoped the Patreon page would aid the development enough to hire another artist. As of May 2022, it contains close to 9,000 supporters and earns over $40,000 per month. According to Massé, there is a document with 100 pages called the "Parabook", containing all the ideas collected so far. Massé's plan is to release the game in Early Access on Steam, then support the game with free updates and modding, where people would share their designs on the Steam Workshop. 

The team wanted to offer a realistic life simulation, meaning the game will not feature any supernatural characters, such as ghosts or aliens.

Awards and nominations 
 2020 Canadian Game Devs - Most Anticipated Canadian Game Winner

References

External links 
 

Upcoming video games
Indie video games
Social simulation video games
Life simulation games
Windows games
MacOS games
Single-player video games
Video games featuring protagonists of selectable gender
Video games developed in Canada